Poplar is a neighborhood in Lower North Philadelphia.  It is located north of Callowhill, between Spring Garden/Fairmount and Northern Liberties, bounded roughly by Girard Avenue to the north, North Broad Street to the west, Spring Garden Street to the south, and 5th Street to the east. The neighborhood is mostly residential with commercial frontage on Broad Street and Girard Avenue and some industrial facilities to the west of the railroad tracks along Percy St. and 9th St.

Housing
Originally, the neighborhood was composed mostly of single-family row houses and some industry. The Depression left many homes in disrepair, leading the city to raze them in the late 1930s to build the Richard Allen Homes, a massive public housing project that replaced blighted areas as well as provided housing for new workers attracted to the city for wartime production. The Richard Allen Homes remained Poplar's defining physical characteristic for the next several decades. Budget cuts by the city effected an egregious degree of deterioration in the homes, and poorly planned open spaces encouraged crime, generating notoriety as a center for crime and drug trafficking by the 1970s and 1980s.

The Allen Homes complemented Cambridge Plaza, a modernist public housing project comprising two 248-unit, high-rise towers and 124 low-rise townhouses. Cambridge Plaza was constructed in 1957 and demolished in 2001, when the Philadelphia Housing Authority began to erect suburban-style duplexes and single-family homes.

In the past ten years the homes were cleared out and replaced with suburban-style single-family homes and duplexes, and other public and senior housing exists on Fairmount Avenue, 8th St., 13th St., etc. Some original row houses remain, mostly south of Fairmount Avenue and west of the SEPTA line.

The Friends Housing Cooperative (FHC) is a residential housing complex which exists on one square block between Fairmount Avenue, Franklin Street, Brown Street and North 8th Street. FHC consists of semi-detached homes built circa 1850 and reconfigured into market-rate, gated apartment community in the early 1950s. After years of neglect and deterioration, this community has experienced a notable renaissance.

Landmarks

While most of Poplar's original housing has been demolished, a handful of defining structures identify the neighborhood and can be seen from various points both in the neighborhood and around the city. The ornate, Victorian Divine Lorraine Hotel fronts on North Broad Street at its intersection with Fairmount Street; the massive, former Strawbridge & Clothier warehouse is located at 9th and Poplar Streets adjacent to the SEPTA elevated line (with the expanded building occupying almost the entire space between Poplar and Girard), and two 1920s-1930s public school buildings (Spring Garden School No. 1 and Spring Garden School, the latter formerly Spring Garden School No. 2) constructed in a Moderne/Art Deco style, designed by noted Philadelphia school architect Irwin Catharine, are located on 12th St. With the exception of the southernmost of the two schools, which remains in use, the rest of the older landmarks remain vacant.  The Divine Lorraine Hotel and the two schools are listed on the National Register of Historic Places along with the Thaddeus Stevens School of Observation, Rodeph Shalom Synagogue, and Mary Channing Wister School.

The Ukrainian Catholic Cathedral of the Immaculate Conception is at 830 North Franklin Street. It was built in 1966 and designed by Julian K. Jastremsky.

Education

Residents are zoned to the School District of Philadelphia. Zoned schools include:
K-8 schools:
Harrison School
Spring Garden School
Benjamin Franklin High School

References 

 
Neighborhoods in Philadelphia